Poland has 56 high-rise buildings that stand at least  tall, being also one of 17 countries in the world to have a supertall skyscraper (building that rises at least ).

Historically, tall architectural bodies in Poland tended to be mostly nonbuilding structures. The first high-rise buildings started to be constructed in Warsaw, Katowice, Wrocław and Łódź in the first half of the 20th century. Notable examples include the PAST Building and Prudential, in Warsaw, as well as Drapacz Chmur, in Katowice. In the 21st century, the country saw a major boom of new skyscrapers, most of which are located in the capital Warsaw.

The tallest building in Poland is currently the 310-metre (1017 ft) tall Varso Tower, in Warsaw, which is also the tallest building in the European Union.

Completed 

Under construction 
This table lists buildings that are under construction in Poland and are planned to rise at least . Buildings that are only approved or proposed are not included in this table.

Approved
This table lists buildings planned to rise at least  that have been approved but the construction has not started yet.

Proposed

Cities with the most skyscrapers

Cities with the most skyscrapers under construction

See also
List of tallest buildings in the European Union
List of tallest buildings in Warsaw
List of tallest buildings in Katowice
List of tallest buildings in Poznań

References

External links

 Poland at The Skyscraper Center database
 Up in the Sky: Polish Skyscrapers